Wells is a constituency represented in the House of Commons of the UK Parliament since 2015 by James Heappey of the Conservative Party.

History 

The original two-member borough constituency was created in 1295, and abolished by the Reform Act 1867 with effect from the 1868 general election.  Its revival saw a more comparable size of electorate across the country and across Somerset, with a large swathe of the county covered by this new seat, under the plans of the third Reform Act and the connected Redistribution of Seats Act 1885 which was enacted the following year.

Political history
The seat was largely Conservative-held during the 20th century and has never elected a Labour MP ever in its history. The only other political party to have been represented is the Liberal Democrats or their predecessor, the Liberal Party, who achieved a marginal victory in 2010, see marginal seat.

Prominent frontbenchers
Sir William Hayter was chief government whip of the Commons under three Liberal Prime Ministers governing from the Lords, (Lord John) Russell, Aberdeen and Palmerston.

So too in this role was Lord Hylton from 1916 to 1922 alongside the Lord Colebrooke in the Conservative-Liberal National coalition.

Robert Sanders was Deputy Chief Whip in the House of Commons, 1918–1919, and Minister of Agriculture and Fisheries, 1922–1924.

Robert Boscawen was a government whip (1988–1989).

David Heathcoat-Amory was Minister for Europe (1993–1994) and later a Shadow Cabinet member (1997–2001).

Boundaries 

1885-1918: The Borough of Wells, and the Sessional Divisions of Axbridge and Wells (except the parish of Binegar).

1918-1950: The Boroughs of Glastonbury and Wells, the Urban Districts of Shepton Mallet and Street, the Rural Districts of Shepton Mallet, Wells, and Wincanton, and in the Rural District of Frome the parishes of Cloford, Marston Bigot, Nunney, Wanstrow, Whatley, and Witharn Friary.

1950-1983: The Boroughs of Glastonbury and Wells, the Urban Districts of Frome, Shepton Mallet, and Street, and the Rural Districts of Frome, Shepton Mallet, Wells, and Wincanton.

1983-2010: The District of Mendip wards of Ashwick, Avalon, Chilcompton and Ston Easton, Ebbor, Glastonbury St Benedict's, Glastonbury St Edmund's, Glastonbury St John's, Glastonbury St Mary's, Moor, Nedge, Pylcombe, Rodney, Sheppey, Shepton Mallet, Street North, Street South, Wells Central, Wells St Cuthbert's, and Wells St Thomas, and the District of Sedgemoor wards of Axbridge, Axe Vale, Berrow, Brent, Burnham North, Burnham South, Cheddar, Highbridge, Mark, Shipham, and Wedmore.

2010–present: The District of Mendip wards of Ashwick and Ston Easton, Avalon, Chilcompton, Glastonbury St Benedict's, Glastonbury St Edmund's, Glastonbury St John's, Glastonbury St Mary's, Knowle, Moor, Nedge, Pylcombe, Rodney and Priddy, St Cuthbert Out North and West, Shepton East, Shepton West, Street North, Street South, Street West, Wells Central, Wells St Cuthbert's, and Wells St Thomas, and the District of Sedgemoor wards of Axbridge, Axe Vale, Berrow, Brent North, Burnham North, Burnham South, Cheddar and Shipham, Highbridge, Knoll, and Wedmore and Mark.

Constituency profile 
Aside from energy, transportation, retail, and distribution which are major sectors, agriculture and tourism are still important areas to this central and quite quintessential part of Somerset which includes the coastal resort of Burnham-on-Sea, the city of Wells with its cathedral, and notable natural landmarks such as the Cheddar Gorge and Glastonbury Tor. The site of the Glastonbury Festival also lies within this seat, causing a major influx of visitors in late June. The founder of the festival, Michael Eavis, stood as the Labour candidate for the 1997 election, receiving 10,204 votes, the highest for Labour since 1974.

Workless claimants who were registered jobseekers were in November 2012 significantly lower than the national average of 3.8%, at 2.1% of the population based on a statistical compilation by The Guardian.

Members of Parliament

MPs 1295–1640

MPs 1640–1832

MPs 1832–1868

MPs 1885–present

Elections

Elections in the 2010s

Elections in the 2000s

Elections in the 1990s

Elections in the 1980s

Elections in the 1970s

Elections in the 1960s

Elections in the 1950s

Election in the 1940s

Elections in the 1930s 

General Election 1939–40:
Another general election was required to take place before the end of 1940. The political parties had been making preparations for an election to take place and by the Autumn of 1939, the following candidates had been selected;
Conservative: Anthony Muirhead
Liberal: James A Brown 
Labour:

Elections in the 1920s

Election results 1885–1918

Elections in the 1880s

Elections in the 1890s 

Joliffe's elevation to the peerage, becoming Lord Hylton, caused a by-election.

Elections in the 1900s

Elections in the 1910s 

General Election 1914–15:

Another General Election was required to take place before the end of 1915. The political parties had been making preparations for an election to take place and by July 1914, the following candidates had been selected;
Unionist: George Sandys
Liberal: Charles Conybeare

Election results 1832–1868

Elections in the 1830s

 Edwards-Vaughan resigned on the first day of polling

Lamont's death caused a by-election.

Elections in the 1840s

Hayter was appointed Judge Advocate General of the Armed Forces, requiring a by-election.

Elections in the 1850s

Tudway's death caused a by-election.

Elections in the 1860s

Elections before 1832

Elections in the 1830s

See also 
 List of parliamentary constituencies in Somerset

Notes

References

Sources 

D Brunton & D H Pennington, Members of the Long Parliament (London: George Allen & Unwin, 1954)
Cobbett's Parliamentary history of England, from the Norman Conquest in 1066 to the year 1803 (London: Thomas Hansard, 1808) titles A-Z
 Henry Stooks Smith, The Parliaments of England from 1715 to 1847, Volume 2 (London: Simpkin, Marshall & Co, 1845)  The Parliaments of England: From 1st George I., to the Present Time

Constituencies of the Parliament of the United Kingdom established in 1295
Constituencies of the Parliament of the United Kingdom disestablished in 1868
Constituencies of the Parliament of the United Kingdom established in 1885
Parliamentary constituencies in Somerset
Constituency